Tragidion deceptum is a species of beetle in the family Cerambycidae. It was described by Swift & Ray in 2008. The adult is black with orange-yellow on the whole of the elytra except for the parts nearest the thorax. The insect is native to the southwest of the United States (Arizona, New Mexico, and Texas) and Mexico.

References

Trachyderini
Beetles described in 2008